The Rodney-class ships of the line were a class of 3 two-deck 90-gun second rates, designed for the Royal Navy by Sir Robert Seppings.

Ships

Builder: Pembroke Dockyard
Ordered: 
Launched: 18 June 1833
Fate: Broken up, 1882

Builder: Plymouth Dockyard
Ordered: 
Launched: 28 June 1839
Fate: Burnt, 1956

Builder: Chatham Dockyard
Ordered: 
Launched: 28 September 1840
Fate: Sold, 1884

References

Lavery, Brian (2003) The Ship of the Line - Volume 1: The development of the battlefleet 1650-1850. Conway Maritime Press. .

 
Ship of the line classes